The Roman Catholic Diocese of Gaborone is a diocese located in the city of Gaborone, Botswana, in the Ecclesiastical province of Pretoria in South Africa.

History
 24 April 1959: Established as Apostolic Prefecture of Bechuanaland from the Diocese of Bulawayo in Zimbabwe, Diocese of Kimberley in South Africa and Apostolic Vicariate of Windhoek in Namibia
 5 August 1966: Promoted as Diocese of Gaberones
 7 April 1970: Renamed as Diocese of Gaborone

Special churches
 The cathedral is Christ the King Cathedral in Gaborone.

Leadership
Prefect Apostolic of Bechuanaland
 Urban Charles Joseph Murphy, C.P. (24 April 1959 – 5 August 1966)
Bishops of Gaberone(s)
 Urban Charles Joseph Murphy, C.P. (5 August 1966 – 28 February 1981)
 Boniface Tshosa Setlalekgosi (30 November 1981 – 5 February 2009)
 Valentine Tsamma Seane (5 February 2009 – 9 August 2017)
 Franklyn Atese Nubuasah, S.V.D. (6 June 2019 – present)
Given the personal title of archbishop on 5 July 2021

See also
Roman Catholicism in Botswana

References

External links
 GCatholic.org 
 Catholic Hierarchy 

 
Christian organizations established in 1959
Roman Catholic dioceses and prelatures established in the 20th century
Roman Catholic Ecclesiastical Province of Pretoria